Alamo, located in the Rio Grande Valley in what is nicknamed the "Land of Two Summers", is a city in the irrigated area of southern Hidalgo County, Texas, United States. Known as the "Refuge to the Valley", it is located in an area of abundant vegetable farming and citrus groves, and is a noted winter resort/retirement town near the Mexico–U.S. border. Alamo is one of the Rio Grande Valley's gateways to Mexico, via U.S. Route 281 and Nuevo Progreso, Tamaulipas, as well as a gateway to the Santa Ana National Wildlife Refuge. Alamo's population was 18,353 at the 2010 census and an estimated 19,910 in 2019.

History

Alamo was laid out in 1909, and named after the Alamo Mission in San Antonio. Alamo is the Spanish/Mexican word for Cottonwood tree.

Geography

Alamo is located in southern Hidalgo County at  (26.185113, –98.117892). It is bordered to the west by the city of San Juan and to the east by the city of Donna.

Demographics

Alamo is part of the McAllen–Edinburg–Mission and Reynosa–McAllen metropolitan areas.

2020 census

As of the 2020 United States census, there were 19,493 people, 6,106 households, and 4,758 families residing in the city.

2000 census
As of the census of 2000,  14,760 people, 4,621 households, and 3,826 families resided in the city. The population density was 2,580.8 people per square mile (996.3/km2). The 6,208 housing units averaged 1,085.5 per square mile (419.0/km2). The racial makeup of the city was 83.61% White (including Hispanics or Latinos), 0.21% African American, 0.43% Native American, 0.09% Asian, 13.73% from other races, and 1.94% from two or more races. Hispanics or Latinos people of any race were 78.10% of the population.

Of the 4,621 households, 36.5% had children under the age of 18 living with them, 66.2% were married couples living together, 13.3% had a female householder with no husband present, and 17.2% were not families. About 15.1% of all households were made up of individuals, and 10.2% had someone living alone who was 65 years of age or older. The average household size was 3.19 and the average family size was 3.57.

In the city, the population was distributed as 30.0% under the age of 18, 9.8% from 18 to 24, 22.9% from 25 to 44, 17.5% from 45 to 64, and 19.8% who were 65 years of age or older. The median age was 33 years. For every 100 females, there were 93.4 males. For every 100 females age 18 and over, there were 88.7 males.

The median income for a household in the city was $23,928, and for a family was $24,827. Males had a median income of $17,476 versus $14,683 for females. The per capita income for the city was $10,564. About 24.9% of families and 32.4% of the population were below the poverty line, including 48.0% of those under age 18 and 12.9% of those age 65 or over.

Government and infrastructure 
The current City Officials are Mayor Diana Martinez, Mayor Pro-Tem Robert De La Garza, Commissioner Oscar Salinas (Place 1), Commissioner Pete Morales (Place 2) and Commissioner Maria Del Pilar Garza (Place 4). The current Chief of Police is Richard Ozuna, a former Captain at the Hidalgo County Sheriff's Office.

The United States Postal Service operates the Alamo Post Office.

Education

Primary and secondary schools 
Most of Alamo's population resides within the Pharr-San Juan-Alamo Independent School District (PSJAISD), although a portion does reside in the Donna Independent School District boundaries.

Elementary schools in the PSJAISD located in Alamo include  Zeferino Farias Elementary, Agusto Guerra Elementary, Santos Livas (previously North Alamo) Elementary, Marcia R. Garza Elementary, and John McKeever Elementary. Middle 
schools: Alamo Middle School and Audie Murphy Middle all serve Alamo. Pharr-San Juan-Alamo Memorial High School is the zoned high school of PSJAISD Alamo.

Captain D. Salinas II Elementary, Sauceda Middle School, and Donna High School serve the Donna ISD portion.

In addition, all Alamo residents are allowed to apply to magnet schools operated by the South Texas Independent School District.

Valley Christian Heritage School is in Alamo.

Idea Public School District enrolls local students in any of a variety of area campuses in located in Alamo, San Juan, Pharr, Donna, and Edinburg.

Public libraries
Sergeant Fernando de la Rosa Memorial Library is located in Alamo. The library is named after United States Army Sergeant Fernando "Nando" De La Rosa, who died during a roadside bomb explosion on October 27, 2009, in the Arghandab River Valley in Afghanistan.

Radio stations
 KFRQ (94.5 FM)
 KJAV (104.9 FM)
 KVLY (107.9 FM)
 KKPS (99.5 FM)

References

External links

 City of Alamo official website
 "Alamo, TX" in Handbook of Texas Online
 Santa Ana National Wildlife Refuge

Cities in Texas
Cities in Hidalgo County, Texas
Populated places established in 1924